Gaanlibah or Ga'an Libah is mountain range, archaeological site, and national park located in the Maroodi Jeex region of Somaliland. Nearby are the Golis Mountains. Its upper slopes are the source of the seasonal Togdheer river that flows through the city of Burao into the Nugaal Valley.

Overview
It is in the western part of the northern mountains, which extend east and west parallel to the northern coast of the Horn of Africa.

Flora and fauna
The natural vegetation includes evergreen and semi-evergreen bushland and thicket at lower elevations, dominated by the shrub Buxus hildebrandtii, which cover approximately 20,000 ha. Woodlands of African juniper (Juniperus procera) and other Afromontane plant communities occur at higher elevations, and cover about 30,000 ha.

Mammals recorded here include hamadryas baboon (Papio hamadryas), klipspringer (Oreotragus oreotragus), beira (Dorcatragus megalotis), and dorcas gazelle (Gazella dorcas pelzelni).

Native birds include the sombre rock chat (Oenanthe dubia), Gambaga flycatcher (Muscicapa gambagae), and Somali golden-winged grosbeak (Rhynchostruthus louisae).

Rock art
The site features a number of caves adorned with rock art of animals and other figures. As no major archaeological excavation has been conducted here, the Gaanlibah paintings are of uncertain origin, purpose and date.

References

External links
 Gaan Libah: Somalia
 Buuraha Gacanlibaax / Gaan Libah / Gan Libah

Archaeological sites in Somaliland
National parks of Somaliland
Important Bird Areas of Somaliland
Somali montane xeric woodlands